Brachychiton bidwillii, commonly known as the dwarf kurrajong or little kurrajong, is a small tree of the genus Brachychiton found in tropical areas of eastern Australia. It was originally classified in the family Sterculiaceae, which is now within Malvaceae.

Notes

References

bidwillii
Flora of Queensland
Malvales of Australia
Trees of Australia
Ornamental trees
Drought-tolerant trees
Plants described in 1859